Gustav Adolphus Schneebeli (May 23, 1853 – February 6, 1923), was a U.S. Representative from the state of Pennsylvania.

Schneebeli was born in Neusalz, Prussian Silesia.  He immigrated to the United States with his parents, who settled in Bethlehem, Pennsylvania.  He attended the Moravian Parochial School.  They later moved to Nazareth, Pennsylvania, and entered upon a mercantile career.  He founded the knit-goods industry of the Nazareth Waist Co.  In 1888 he established a lace manufacturing company, of which he became sole owner.

Schneebeli was elected as a Republican to the 59th Congress.  He was an unsuccessful candidate for reelection in 1906.  He continued in the lace manufacturing business until his death in Nazareth in 1923.  Interment in Moravian Cemetery.

Sources

The Political Graveyard

1853 births
1923 deaths
Prussian emigrants to the United States
People from Nowa Sól
People from the Province of Silesia
Republican Party members of the United States House of Representatives from Pennsylvania
19th-century American businesspeople
20th-century American businesspeople
20th-century American politicians
Businesspeople from Pennsylvania
American manufacturing businesspeople